Bergtatt – Et eeventyr i 5 capitler (translated as "Spellbound – A Fairy Tale in 5 Chapters") is the debut studio album by the Norwegian band Ulver, issued on February 1995 via Head Not Found. The album was recorded at Endless Lydstudio in Oslo in November and December 1994 with Kristian Romsøe as engineer and co-producer.

The album was praised for its unique atmosphere and was described as "mysterious, melancholic, eerie, and oddly tranquil". The archaic Dano-Norwegian lyrics were greatly influenced by Scandinavian folktales and inspired by Baroque poets such as Ludvig Holberg and the hymn-writer Thomas Kingo.

Background
Bergtatt, the first part of what has become known as "The Trilogie – Three Journeyes Through the Norwegian Netherworlde", was released during the rise of the Norwegian black metal subculture in Norway in the early 1990s. Separated from the more straightforward black metal sound of their contemporaries, Ulver incorporated elements of Norwegian folk music, utilizing acoustic guitars, droning low choirs, flutes, melody-focused songwriting and clean vocals together with fast tempos, shrieked vocals, highly distorted guitars, blast beat drumming, raw (lo-fi) recording and unconventional song structures. This earned them the label "folk metal".

Bergtatt is notable in that its lyrical content deviates substantially from that of other second-wave black metal albums. While it is heavily rooted in Norwegian folklore, it features no anti-Christian themes, unlike the music of many of Ulver's contemporaries, particularly Burzum and Darkthrone. 

The folk-like acoustic elements of Bergtatt were isolated and expanded upon for their second album Kveldssanger, incorporating classical guitars, cello and choral chamber chants overlaid with subtle orchestral landscapes. The band's third album, Nattens madrigal, abandoned these acoustic and atmospheric elements, and was recorded with an intentionally underproduced, "raw and grim black metal" sound.

In an interview with Rob Hughes for Unrestrained Magazine in 2007, Kristoffer Rygg reflected, "We were influenced by a period known as the Kingdom of Denmark–Norway (1536–1814)—the language and literature of that era combined with the superstition and folklore of the Middle Ages. It was the kind of stuff we were learning about in school at the time. When it comes to music, we were already listening to a whole slew of other things, and already had our two next records in mind, so by the time Nattens madrigal (1997) was released, we had developed a strong urge to explore something else. We had also acquired the knowledge of how to do so in the meantime."

Critical reception

AllMusic praised the album, writing, "Bergtatt is not the heaviest or most aggressive black metal around by a long shot; nor is it the most evil or blasphemous. What makes the album stand out, along with the varied vocal styles and the excellent songwriting, is its unique atmosphere—mysterious, melancholic, eerie and oddly tranquil."

Angry Metal Guy stated: "Musically, the album is focused on melody and atmosphere, it blends black metal with acoustics, reverb, and gorgeous, melancholic songwriting. It even eschews Satanism in text and imagery. Except Ulver was right there when it all went down; outsiders to a scene of outsiders." Going on to acknowledge Bergtatts influence on Agalloch, Cormorant, Alcest and October Falls; the reviewer goes on to reflect "Bergtatt is the work of kids. These guys weren't old, they weren't seasoned; they were 16 and 17 when they started this band, and 18/19 when Bergtatt dropped on the famous Head Not Found label 2 years later. They were—from Garm's own mouth—not super mature or sophisticated."

Track listing

Personnel 

Ulver
Kristoffer Rygg - vocals, lyrics
Håvard Jørgensen - guitar
Torbjørn Heimen Pedersen (Aismal) - guitar
Hugh Mingay - bass guitar
Erik Olivier "AiwarikiaR" Lancelot - drums, percussion

Additional Musicians
Sverd - piano 
Lill Kathrine Stensrud - additional vocals, flute  

Other Credits
Kristian Romsøe - co-producer, engineer, mixing
Craig Morris - mastering
Tania "Nacht" Stene - album cover design

Charts

References 

Ulver albums
1995 debut albums
Head Not Found albums